Doom Resurrection is a first-person shooter survival horror game developed by Escalation Studios and published by id Software. It was released on 26 June 2009.  John Carmack led the development team. The setting for Doom Resurrection is parallel to Doom 3, and it uses the characters and art of the previously developed game. The game is considered to be lost media as it's not publicly available

Plot
The game stars an unnamed marine, a survivor of Bravo Team during the events of Doom 3. He awakens, and is soon confronted by Dr. Garret, who presents him Sam, a flying droid capable of opening doors and hacking computers. Together with Sam, the survivor makes his way through the Mars facility, battling zombies and demons on his way through the base. The task is to reach a port, where a spaceship full of surviving members of the UAC facility is preparing to launch off. On his way, the marine meets more survivors, collects valuable information through Sam, and visits Hell, where he closes the demon-spawning portals. Eventually, the marine is forced to leave Dr. Garret behind, and Sam sacrifices itself to support a closing door to the spaceship, leaving only the data implicating UAC. The marine successfully boards the ship and leaves Mars with a few other survivors.

References 

2009 video games
Doom (franchise) games
First-person shooters
IOS-only games
IOS games
Video games about demons
Video games developed in the United States
Video games set in hell
Video games set on Mars
Single-player video games
Video game spin-offs
Horror video games